Svätá Mária is a village and municipality in the Trebišov District in the Košice Region of south-eastern Slovakia.

History
In historical records the village was first mentioned in 1261.

Geography
The village lies at an altitude of 98 metres and covers an area of 12.942 km².
It has a population of about 620 people.

Ethnicity
The village is about 88% Hungarian and 12% Slovak.

Facilities
The village has a public library and a football pitch.

External links
http://www.statistics.sk/mosmis/eng/run.html

Villages and municipalities in Trebišov District
Zemplín (region)
Hungarian communities in Slovakia